Dione Marian Digby, Lady Digby,  (née Sherbrooke; born 23 February 1934) is a British arts administrator.

She is the daughter of  Rear-Adm. Robert St Vincent Sherbrooke and his wife, Rosemary Neville Buckley. She married Edward Digby (son of Edward Kenelm Digby, 11th Baron Digby of Geashill, and the Hon. Constance Pamela Alice Bruce), on 18 December 1952. Her husband succeeded to the peerage in 1964. They have two sons and a daughter (Henry Noel Kenelm Digby, Rupert Simon Digby and Zara Jane Digby).

A former chancellor of Bournemouth University, she 
was appointed Dame Commander of The Most Excellent Order of the British Empire in 1991.

References

1934 births
Living people
People associated with Bournemouth University
Dames Commander of the Order of the British Empire
British arts administrators
Women arts administrators
British baronesses
Irish baronesses
Place of birth missing (living people)
Wives of knights